Foodfight! is a 2012 American computer-animated adventure comedy film produced by Threshold Entertainment and directed by Lawrence Kasanoff. The film features the voices of Charlie Sheen, Wayne Brady, Hilary Duff, Eva Longoria, Larry Miller, and Christopher Lloyd. Foodfight! takes place in the "Marketropolis" supermarket, which, after closing time, transforms into a city where all the citizens are "Ikes", personified well-known marketing icons. The story follows a cereal brand mascot, Dex Dogtective, who, along with his best friend, Daredevil Dan, bands together a group of "Ikes" in Marketropolis to fight against the forces of the evil Brand X, who threaten to take over the entire supermarket.

After raising tens of millions of dollars in funding, Foodfight! had a troubled and much delayed production. The film was originally scheduled for a Christmas 2003 theatrical release; however, this failed to materialize, and later planned release dates were also missed. By September 2011, after the producers defaulted on a loan, creditors auctioned off the film's assets and all associated rights to Lionsgate.

In 2012, the film had a low-key release, being direct-to-video in most territories. Its critical reception has been overwhelmingly negative, with most criticism directed towards the animation, humor, story and excessive product placement. It has since been frequently discussed as one of the worst films of all time.

Plot
When night falls at the supermarket Marketropolis, the store products' mascots ("Ikes") come to life and interact with each other. Heroic cereal mascot Dex Dogtective is about to propose to his girlfriend Sunshine Goodness, a raisin mascot, but she goes missing just before he is able to do so.

Six months later, a Brand X representative called "Mr. Clipboard" arrives at Marketropolis and aggressively pushes Brand X's range of generic products to Leonard, the store's manager. In the world of the Ikes, the arrival of Lady X, the seductive Brand X detergent Ike, causes a commotion at Dex's club, the Copabanana.

Brand X products begin to replace previous products, which is mirrored in the Ikes' world with the deaths of several Ikes. After Dex's friend Daredevil Dan, a chocolate squirrel, disappears, Dex begins to investigate. After rebuffing Lady X's attempts to bring him to Brand X's side, Dex is locked in a dryer with Dan to be melted, but the two manage to escape. Dan and Dex find out that Brand X contains an addictive and toxic secret ingredient.

Dex and Dan attempt to initiate a product recall with Leonard's computer. A Brand X Ike cuts power just as they send the message. Dex then rallies the citizens of Marketropolis to fight the armies of Brand X in a massive food fight. The citizens win the battle by using the supermarket's electricity.

Dex rescues Sunshine, who had been held hostage in the Brand X tower, and escapes with the help of Dan. Mr. Clipboard then enters the Ikes' world, but he is taken down by Dex, who discovers that he is a robot controlled by Lady X. Lady X reveals that she had previously been the hideous Ike of an unsuccessful brand of prunes, and had been stealing Sunshine's essence to create a new brand. Dex and Sunshine defeat her, reverting her to her original form. With Brand X defeated and a cure found that revives the killed Ikes, Dex and Sunshine finally get married.

Cast
Alongside many licensed characters, the principal characters of this film are original characters.

 Charlie Sheen as Dex Dogtective, an anthropomorphic dog investigator, owner of the Copabanana nightclub, and mascot for a Cereal product.
 Wayne Brady as Daredevil Dan, Dex's best friend; a squirrel pilot of a small aircraft and mascot for a chocolate product and the film's comic relief.
 Hilary Duff as Sunshine Goodness, an anthropomorphic cat mascot for a raisin brand; Dex's fiancée.
 Eva Longoria as Lady X / Priscilla, former mascot of the prune product turned owner and leader of Brand X.
 Larry Miller as Vlad Chocool, a chocolate cereal vampire bat with attraction for Dan.
 Christopher Lloyd as Mr. Clipboard, the robotic representative for Brand X products in the human world.
 Robert Costanzo as Maximillus Moose
 Chris Kattan as Polar Penguin
 Ed Asner as Mr. Leonard
 Jerry Stiller as General X
 Christine Baranski as Hedda Shopper
 Lawrence Kasanoff as Cheasel T. Weasel
 Harvey Fierstein as Fat Cat Burglar
 Cloris Leachman as Brand X Lunch Lady
 Haylie Duff as Sweetcakes
 Shelley Morrison as Lola Fruitola
 Edie McClurg as Mrs. Butterworth
 George Johnsen as Kaptain Krispy
 Greg Ellis as Hairy Hold
 James Arnold Taylor as Doctor Si Nustrix
 Jeff Bennett as Lieutenant X
 Stephen Stanton as Mr. Clean (deleted scene), Lord Flushington
 Jeff Bergman as Charlie Tuna
 Sean Catherine Derek as Toddler's Mom
 Enn Reitel as Kung Tofu / François Fromage
 Daniel Franzese as Twinkleton
 Jason Ortenberg, Zachary Liebreich-Johnsen, Andrew Ortenberg and Jennifer Keith as the Ike Kids
 Joshua Wexler, George Johnsen, Jason Harris, and Greg Eagles as the Hairless Hamster Henchmen

Additional voices are provided by Melissa Disney, Jennifer Keith, Bob Bergen, Susan Silo, Daniel Bernhardt, Jeff Bennett, Stephen Stanton, James Arnold Taylor, and John Bloom.

Soundtrack
Foodfight! had an extensive soundtrack built mostly of cover versions of well-known contemporary songs and original songs sung by the characters' voice actors, provided by a variety of individual licensing companies. This being said, the film's end credits overlay soundtrack, an upbeat duet pop song titled "The Brightside" by Tif McMillin and Richard Page, was an original song. Few of the songs from the film's soundtrack, including "The Brightside", were ever commercially released.

"It's Our World"
Written by Neil Jason and John McCurry

"Tonight's the Nite"
Written by Neil Jason and J. Davis

"Dare The Day"
Performed by Wayne Brady
Written by Michael Lloyd and Greg O'Connor

"I Heard it Through the Grapevine"
Performed by Joe Esposito (as "Joe Bean Esposito") and Brooklyn Dreams
Written by Norman Whitfield (as Norman J. Whitfield) and Barrett Strong

"Wow!"
Performed by Good Grief featuring Shanna Crooks
Written by Keith Ridenour, Bud Tower, Douglas Shawe and Wayne Hood

"You Are My Sunshine"
Written by Jimmie Davis and Charles Mitchell

"Honor is Ours"
Performed by The Swamp Daddys
Written by Keith Ridenour, Dean Madonia and Scott Avery

"Brand X"
Performed by Jeff Bennett
Written by Lawrence Kasanoff

"USDA"
Written by Lawrence Kasanoff

"Fire in the Skies"
Written by Janey Street, Charles English and Pam Wolfe

"The Brightside"
Performed by Tif McMillin and Richard Page
Written by Janey Street and Vince Melamed

"You Got Me Believing"
Performed by Joe Esposito (as "Joe Bean Esposito") and Brooklyn Dreams
Written by Donna Summer and Bruce Sudano

"Hava Nagilah"
Adapted by Michael Lloyd and John D'Andrea

Production

Conception 
Lawrence Kasanoff and a Threshold Entertainment employee, Joshua Wexler, created the concept in 1997. A $25 million joint investment into the project was made by Threshold and the Korean investment company Natural Image, with the producers expecting that foreign pre-sales and loans against the sales would provide the remaining portion of the budget. The estimated remainder was $50 million. Kasanoff also decided to produce and direct the film, despite having no prior experience in the animation field.

Production setbacks 
The film was created and produced by the digital effects shop at Threshold, located in Santa Monica, California in the Los Angeles metropolitan area. In December 2002, Kasanoff reported that hard drives containing most unfinished assets from the film had been stolen, in what he called an act of "industrial espionage" and "an incredibly complex crime". An investigation, which included the United States Secret Service, was unable to find the thief. The film was supposed to be computer-animated, with an exaggerated use of "squash and stretch" to resemble the Looney Tunes shorts, but after production resumed in 2004, Kasanoff changed it to a style more centered in motion capture, with the result being that "he and animators were speaking two different languages".

Delays 
Lionsgate established a distribution deal and the financing company StoryArk represented investors who gave $20 million in funding to Threshold in 2005 due to the Lionsgate deal, the celebrity voice actors, and the product tie-ins. A release date in 2005 was later announced, but missed. Another distribution deal was struck in 2007, but again, nothing came of it. Lionsgate had a negative reaction to the delays. The investors had grown impatient due to the film production company defaulting on its secured promissory note and the release dates that were not met.

Auction 
Finally, in 2011, the film was auctioned for $2.5 million. StoryArk investors had ultimately invoked a clause in their contract that allowed the Fireman's Fund Insurance Company, which had insured Foodfight!, to complete and release the film as inexpensively and quickly as possible. Animator Ken Bailey stated that "The film was already ruined. They were just trying to salvage what they could."

Release
The insurance company received the copyright to the film in 2012 and began releasing it and its associated merchandise. In June 2012, Foodfight! received a limited release in the United Kingdom, grossing approximately £15,000 of ticket sales on its single week in theatres. It was released on DVD in Europe that October with distribution by Boulevard Entertainment.

In February 2013, the film was released on VOD and was released on DVD in the United States on May 7, 2013. Jake Rossen of The New York Times described the film's United States release as "a muted debut". The United States release was delayed because the American distributor, Viva Pictures, wanted to release it when Walmart could arrange for a satisfactory product display for the film. According to company president Victor Elizalde, Viva Pictures' modest investment of an unspecified sum had proved profitable.

Reception
At the time the film was announced, it was denounced for taking product placement to the extreme, and doing it in a film targeted at children. Kasanoff responded to the controversy by noting that they were not paid money for the brand inclusion and therefore the addition of known brands did not constitute product placement, though the brands were expected to provide $100 million worth of cross-promotion.

Since its release, Foodfight! has been heavily panned by critics and audiences alike and is considered one of the worst films ever made: Mental Floss included it in a list of "10 Really Bad Movies that Define 'Bad Movies'" in 2012 and it appeared in lists of the worst movies ever made on Digital Trends in 2017, MSN in 2018, Fotogramas in 2020 and Time Out in 2022. It has also been referred to as one of the worst animated films ever made by Indiewire in 2015, Comic Book Resources in 2021, and twice by Screen Rant, in 2017 and 2020. In 2017, Rebecca Hawkes of The Daily Telegraph described Foodfight! as "the worst animated children's film ever made".

A 2012 review by Kate Valentine of Hollywood News called it "by far the crappiest piece of crap I have ever had the misfortune to watch", and a 2013 article from The New York Times was similarly scathing, saying, "The animation appears unfinished [...] And the plot [...] is impenetrable and even offensive." The New York Times article also reported that Foodfight! has been "seized upon by Internet purveyors of bad cinema".

Describing the film as "one of those fall-of-civilization moments", Nathan Rabin of The A.V. Club wrote in 2013 that: "the grotesque ugliness of the animation alone would be a deal-breaker even if the film weren't also glaringly inappropriate in its sexuality, nightmare-inducing in its animation, and filled with Nazi overtones and iconography even more egregiously unfit for children than the script's wall-to-wall gauntlet of crude double entendres and weird intimations of inter-species sex". Rabin revisited Foodfight! in a 2019 article, stating that it "was the kind of bad movie I live for. This is the kind of movie so unbelievably, surreally and exquisitely terrible that you want to share it with the rest of the world. I was put on earth to suffer through abominations like Foodfight! so that society as a whole might benefit from my Christ-like sacrifice."

In 2020, Esquires Tom Nicholson wrote that the film was "The Room, rendered in horribly sharp polygons" and that it was "easily the most horrifically ugly, confusing and unsettling animated film ever made."

Merchandise
Associated Foodfight! merchandise was produced and was sold in stores and online, with at least some being released several years prior to the film. There was also a Foodfight! video game planned for the GameCube, PlayStation 2 and Game Boy Advance. It was shown off at E3 2006, but was cancelled.

References

Further reading

External links

 
 
 
 .

2012 films
2010s American animated films
2010s adventure comedy films
2012 computer-animated films
American adventure comedy films
2010s children's adventure films
2010s children's animated films
2010s children's fantasy films
American computer-animated films
American children's animated adventure films
American children's animated comedy films
Animated adventure films
Films about food and drink
Films scored by Walter Murphy
Animated films about dogs
Films produced by Lawrence Kasanoff
Lionsgate films
2012 comedy films
2010s English-language films